Sterphus calypso is a species of Hoverfly in the family Syrphidae.

Distribution
Bolivia.

References

Eristalinae
Insects described in 1994
Diptera of South America